Silvia Cavalleri (born 10 October 1972) is an Italian professional golfer who plays on the U.S.-based LPGA Tour and Ladies European Tour. She was the first Italian to win a tournament on the LPGA Tour.

Amateur career and education
Cavalleri was born in Milan, Italy. She won the 1990 Girls Amateur Championship and represented Europe in the Vagliano Trophy five times between 1989 and 1997. She represented Italy in the Espirito Santo Trophy World Amateur Team Championship in 1992 and 1996, was the 1996 World Amateur individual champion, and the 1997 U.S. Women's Amateur champion. She won the European Ladies Amateur Championship in 1996 and 1997.

She graduated from Politecnico di Milano university in 1998 with a degree in architecture.

Professional career
Cavalleri turned professional in 1997 and played in 1998 on the Ladies European Tour. She joined the LPGA Tour in 1999. She won her first professional tournament in 2007 at the Corona Championship, becoming the first Italian to win an LPGA tournament.

Professional wins (2)

LPGA Tour (1)

Ladies European Tour wins (1)
1999 Royal Marie-Claire Open

Results in LPGA majors
Results not in chronological order before 2014.

Note: The Women's British Open replaced the du Maurier Classic as an LPGA major in 2001.
^ The Evian Championship was added as a major in 2013.

CUT = missed the half-way cut
WD = withdrew
"T" = tied

Team appearances
Amateur
European Ladies' Team Championship (representing Italy): 1989, 1991, 1993, 1995, 1997
Espirito Santo Trophy (representing Italy): 1992, 1996

Professional
World Cup (representing Italy): 2006, 2008

References

External links

Italian female golfers
Ladies European Tour golfers
LPGA Tour golfers
Winners of ladies' major amateur golf championships
Mediterranean Games medalists in golf
Mediterranean Games gold medalists for Italy
Mediterranean Games bronze medalists for Italy
Competitors at the 1997 Mediterranean Games
Polytechnic University of Milan alumni
1972 births
Living people
20th-century Italian women
21st-century Italian women